The Danel Quartet is a French string quartet established in June 1991.

History 
The ensemble has worked with the Amadeus Quartet. For Shostakovich's complete string quartets, it worked with the Borodin Quartet and Fyodor Druzhinin of the Beethoven Quartet and also with Pierre Penassou and Walter Levin, both members of the LaSalle Quartet. The Danel Quartet performs the classical repertoire as well as contemporary music. They are specialized in the Russian repertoire. Their recordings of Shostakovich's and Weinberg's quartets (world premiere) are a reference.

Since 2005, the Danel Quartet has been "Quartet in Residence" at the University of Manchester, and since 2016, in residence at TivoliVredenburg, Utrecht. From 2019 to 2021, they will be in residence at the Wigmore Hall for a complete double of Shostakovich and Weinberg's string quartets.

Members 
 Marc Danel - first violin (since 1991)
 Gilles Milet - second violin (since 1991)
 Vlad Bogdanas - viola (since 2005)
 Yovan Markovitch - cello (since 2013)

Premieres 
 Olivier Greif, String quartet No 2 (1996)
 Krzysztof Meyer, String quartet No 14 « Au-delà de l'absence » (1998)
 Alexander Raskatov, Gebet for soprano and String quartet (1998)
 Bruno Mantovani, les fées string quartet
 Bruno Mantovani, Quintet with harp
 Bruno Mantovani, Quintet with 2 cellos
 Wolfgang Rihm, Sextet for clarinet, horn and string quartet

Discography 
 Dmitri Shostakovich - complete string quartes (October 2001–June 2005, 5CD Fuga libera FUG512 / Alpha) 
 Peter Swinnen, Lydia Chagoll - La vieille dame et la fille nomade (Artist consultancy DIS 001)
 Ahmet Adnan Saygun - complete string quartets (1–4 December 2003/20-22 September/19 November 2004, 2CD CPO 999 923-2) 
 Hao-Fu Zhang - Qia-Xiao (June 2002/May 2003/February 2004, Cypres CYP4617) 
 Felix Mendelssohn - String quartets, op. 44, No 1 and 2 (Eufoda 1355)
 Pascal Dusapin, René Koering - String quartets (May 2003, Accord 476 1919) 
 Elmar Lampson - Fadenkreuze (Col Legno 20 234) 
 Adolphe Biarent - Quintet with piano (Cypres CYP4611)
 André Souris - Musics (Cypres CYP4610)
 Benoît Mernier - Les idées heureuses (1997/2001, Cypres CYP4613) 
 Patrick De Clerck - Chamber music (May/June 1994, Megadisc MDC 7866) 
 Charles Gounod - String quartets (January 1997, Auvidis V4798) 
 Manuel Rosenthal - Chamber music (1996, Calliope, Karel Goeyvaerts - Chamber music (December 1995/January 1996, Megadisc MDC 7853) 
 Nicolas Bacri - Chamber music (REM 311 276XCD)
 Alexandre Raskatov - Chamber music (Megadisc MDC 7825)
 Mieczysław Weinberg - complete string quartets (CPO) — World premieres of quartets 3, 4 and 6.

Bibliography

References

External links 
 Official website
 Discography on Discogs
 Gounod, Quatuor à cordes No. 1 in C Major "Le petit quatuor": I. Adagio - Allegro moderato (YouTube)
 Danel Quartet on Philharmonie de Paris

Danel
Musical groups established in 1991